Pesto is a type of sauce in Italian cuisine.

Pesto may also refer to:

 Pesto (see), a former bishopric and present Latin Catholic titular see on the Ancient site of Paestum in Italy
 Robert Peston, BBC financial journalist, informally known as "Pesto"
 Pesto, a 1999 EP by Less Than Jake
 Pesto, a character on the animated TV series Animaniacs
 Pesto family, characters on the animated TV series Bob's Burgers

See also
 
 Pistou, a type of sauce in Provencal cuisine